Gedeon Ladányi (5 January 1914 – 28 August 1990) was a Hungarian speed skater. He competed in two events at the 1948 Winter Olympics.

References

1914 births
1990 deaths
Hungarian male speed skaters
Olympic speed skaters of Hungary
Speed skaters at the 1948 Winter Olympics
Speed skaters from Budapest